Richard Welch (1929–1975) was an American intelligence officer.

Richard Welch may also refer to:

Richard Welch (cricketer), English cricketer
Richard J. Welch (1869–1940), American politician
Richard Welch (Medal of Honor), Union Army soldier